Statistics of Liberian Premier League in season 1976.

Overview
Saint Joseph Warriors won the championship.

References
Liberia - List of final tables (RSSSF)

Football competitions in Liberia